Sepiadariidae is a family of cuttlefish, cephalopods in the order Sepiida.

Classification
 Genus Sepiadarium
 Sepiadarium auritum
 Sepiadarium austrinum, southern bottletail squid
 Sepiadarium gracilis
 Sepiadarium kochi, tropical bottletail squid
 Sepiadarium nipponianum
 Genus Sepioloidea
 Sepioloidea lineolata, striped pyjama squid
 Sepioloidea magna
 Sepioloidea pacifica, Pacific bobtail squid

References

External links

Cuttlefish
Cephalopod families
Taxa named by Gustav Fischer